Coscinodiscus elegans is a species of diatom in the family Coscinodiscaceae. It is found in the Gulf of Mexico.

References 

Species described in 1866
Coscinodiscophyceae
Biota of the Gulf of Mexico